Hürth is a town in the Rhein-Erft-Kreis, North Rhine-Westphalia, Germany. Hürth shares borders with the city of Cologne and is about 6 km to the southwest of Cologne city centre, at the northeastern slope of the natural preserve Kottenforst-Ville. The town consists of thirteen districts, once independent villages, and is distributed over a relatively large area. The municipal area is interspersed with lakes and stretches of forest.

In former times, the Eifel Aqueduct, a Roman aqueduct which supplied the city of Cologne with drinking water, went through Hürth. Remnants of various aqueducts can still be found underground. It is also famous as the birthplace of Michael Schumacher.

Geography
Hürth is situated about 6 km to the southwest of Cologne city centre, at the northeastern slope of the Kottenforst-Ville nature reserve.

The town, consisting of thirteen formerly independent villages, is essentially made up of numerous subdivisions and commercial centres distributed over a relatively large area. The municipal area is interspersed with lakes and stretches of forest.

Coat of arms
Hürth's coat of arms shows an eagle from the family coat of arms belonging to the knight Hurth von Schönecken, the cross of Cologne and a cogwheel that refers to the heavy industry. It was awarded to the community on October 26, 1934, by a verdict of the Prussian Ministry of State.

Districts
 Alstädten/Burbach
 Alt-Hürth
 Berrenrath
 Efferen
 Fischenich
 Gleuel
 Hermülheim
 Hürth-Mitte
 Kalscheuren
 Kendenich
 Knapsack
 Sielsdorf
 Stotzheim

History

On April 1, 1930, the rural communities of Hürth (with Alstädten and Knapsack), Berrenrath, Fischenich, Gleuel (with Sielsdorf and Burbach), Hermülheim and Kendenich (with Kalscheuren) were united into a new country community called Hürth. After the same year's failed attempt by the city of Cologne, with its then-mayor Konrad Adenauer, to incorporate Efferen, Efferen was associated to Hürth in 1933, in tandem with Stotzheim. This made Hürth the largest rural community of Germany until 1978, when Hürth ceased being a rural community and became a suburb of Cologne as new developments in Efferen closed the gap between the city of Cologne and Hürth.

The country administration of the rural district Cologne was seated in Hürth on November 22, 1963. From 1816, it had been seated in the city of Cologne itself. The administration moved to Bergheim on September 3, 1993.

Hürth is home to the Bundessprachenamt, which was founded on July 4, 1969.

Alstädten
Alstädten was first mentioned documentarily in 1185.

Burbach
Burbach was first mentioned documentarily in 1233. Nowadays, Alstädten and Burbach are one district named Alstädten-Burbach.

Berrenrath
Berrenrath was first mentioned documentarily in 922. The resettlement of Berrenrath onto a now-abandoned brown coal mine was decided on February 27, 1952. This was necessary due to mining plans of the Roddergrube AG. The resettlement was completed in the September 1995.

Efferen
The Efferen district had its first documentary mention as a pastoral town in 1189. The Catholics first humbled themselves with a plain wooden church. On June 6, 1869, this church was replaced with a solid building, consecrated by auxiliary bishop Baudri.

On October 31, 1944, large parts of Efferen, including the church and the hospital, were destroyed in an air raid; thirty-six people died.

On December 20, 1953, Boue, a member of the church assembly, consecrated the newly built Evangelic church, designed by architect Jürgen Körber. Two years later, on November 25, 1956, a new Roman Catholic church, which was designed by the Cologne architects Wolfram Borgard and Fritz Volmer, was consecrated by auxiliary bishop Wilhem Cleven.

Fischenich
Fischenich was first mentioned documentarily in 1189.

Gleuel
Gleuel was first mentioned documentarily in 898.

Hermülheim
Hermülheim was first mentioned documentarily in 943.

In Hermülheim the town's two grammar schools are located: the Ernst-Mach-Gymnasium and the Albert-Schweizer-Gymnasium.

Hürth (Alt-Hürth)
Hürth was first mentioned documentarily in 1185.

Hürth-Mitte
The building of the residential area Hürth-Mitte, that was begun in 1964 according to a decision by the municipal council in 1960, had the aim of establishing a "city centre" in the approximate geographic centre of Hürth. The decision was evidently benefitted by the constantly raising population in those times. This was partially completed by 1985, with the new town hall and community centre having been erected. Hürth-Mitte is also the site of the Hürth Park, a shopping mall, which serves as the town's economic and social centre. Hürth-Mitte is not a district for itself, but officially belongs to Hermülheim.

Kalscheuren
Kalscheuren was first mentioned documentarily in 1305.

Kendenich
Kendenich was first mentioned documentarily in 941.

Knapsack
Knapsack, its first documentary mention in 1566, started to emerge into a notable town after 1900 due to establishment and development of industry (1906 the Knapsack-Griesheim AG, later known as the Hoechst AG; 1913 construction of the brown coal power plant Goldenberg-Werk)

Due to environmental constraints, 4,000 citizens had to be resettled between the years 1969 and 1979.

Sielsdorf
Sielsdorf was first mentioned documentarily in 898.

Stotzheim
Stotzheim was first mentioned documentarily in 1223.

Sights
In former times, the Eifel Aqueduct, a Roman aqueduct which supplied the city of Cologne with drinking water, went through Hürth. A couple of springs and streams in today's municipal area were used for that purpose before the Eifel aqueduct was built. Remnants of the aqueducts can still be found in the underground of the city.

Facility 4101, Tower 93

In 1977 a covered public observation deck, accessible by a staircase in the centre of the pylon, was installed at a height of 27 metres on this tower, which was in all probability the only observation deck ever installed on an electricity pylon. In 2002 two single-phase AC circuits of the 110 kV-line Cologne-Sindorf used by the German railway company, DB AG, were installed on its lowest crossbar.

In 2010 the observation platform, including the staircase, was removed, after repeated vandalism, which concerned also parts important for the integrity of the pylon. Today only a concrete plate between its legs and a pattern in the form of an inverted "v" in its lattice structure remember to the former observation deck.

External links
 http://skyscraperpage.com/diagrams/?buildingID=120476
 Emporis.com

Notable people

From Hürth
 Michael Schumacher (born 1969), Formula One driver
 Ralf Schumacher (born 1975), Formula One driver, brother of Michael Schumacher, uncle of Mick Schumacher
 Ferdinand von Lüninck (1755–1825), Prince-Bishop of Corvey and Bishop of Münster
 Paul Henckels (1885–1967), actor
 Josef Metternich (1915–2005), opera singer, music and singing teacher
 Wolfgang von Trips (1928–1961), Formula One driver
 Jean Breuer (born 1951), cyclist (World Championship 1972)
 Reinhard Kleist (born 1970), comic artist and graphic designer

Other
 Anne Will, (born 1966), television journalist and moderator, went to school in Hürth
 Karl-Josef Assenmacher, former football referee
 André Greipel, German cyclist, winner of several Tour de France stages and German champions 2013 and 2014
 Ralf Grabsch, cyclist
 Sarah Engels, second place in the 8th season of "Deutschland sucht den Superstar (Germany seeks the superstar)", currently resides in Hürth
 Dennis from Hürth (Deutsch: Dennis aus Hürth), is a comedian who often describes himself as son of efferen and adds his origin in his performances

Public transport
Since September 29, 1997, Hürth has a bus network that covers most of the city's area. There are six bus lines, labelled 711 through 720, by the city's public transport corporation, and another five lines that are not associated with the SVH, having only a number of bus stops in Hürth.

Hürth-Kalscheuren station is located in Kalscheuren and operated by Deutsche Bahn. Two Regionalbahn services stop each hour, connecting to Cologne, Bonn and Euskirchen, while other Intercity and Regional-Express pass through without stopping.

Additionally, Hürth is connected to Cologne and Bonn via the Stadtbahn line 18 of the Cologne Stadtbahn.

All local public transport, including that of the Deutsche Bahn, is subject to the Verkehrsverbund Rhein-Sieg, which is a combine of public transport organizations, setting unified prices for the whole of the combine.

Twin towns – sister cities

Hürth is twinned with:

 Nissewaard, Netherlands (1966)
 Thetford, England, United Kingdom (1966)
 Argelès-sur-Mer, France (1988)
 Kabarnet, Kenya (1988)
 Skawina, Poland (1996)
 Burhaniye, Turkey (2011)
 Peremyshliany, Ukraine (2021)

Literature
 Clemens Klug: "Hürth - wie es war, wie es wurde" (1961)
 Herbert Sinz: "Auf der grünen Wiese"
 Herbert Sinz, Heinrich Schnitzler: "Hürth in alten Bildern" (1980), 
 Heinrich Schnitzler: "50 Jahre Ortsgemeinschaft Hürth-Gleuel" (1985)
 Helmut Neßeler: "Hürth wie es früher war" (1999), 
 Manfred Faust: "Geschichte der Stadt Hürth" (2009), 
 Raymund Gottschalk: "Römer und Franken in Hürth" (2014),

References

External links

Rhein-Erft-Kreis